Battle of the Planets is a comic book series based on the television series of the same name.  10 issues were published from June 1979 to February 1981 by Western Publishing in Gold Key and Whitman comics. Top Cow released a dozen comics in the 00's.

Publication history
Originally released in comic book form by Gold Key Comics in 1979, the series was later revamped by Top Cow Productions with a new twelve-issue limited series starting in 2002. The series was originally planned as an ongoing comic, but low sales led to its cancellation at issue 12, which ended the series with a cliffhanger.  A two-issue mini, Endgame (originally listed as Coup De Gras), was solicited in 2005, and was meant to tie up the loose ends, but never made it to print.

In 2003, there were a number of crossover one-shots starting with Witchblade.  This was followed by two crossover issues with the ThunderCats; the first (May 2003) was published by Top Cow and the second (July 2003) was published by Wildstorm.

These were followed by a number of other comics: a Battle Book one-shot, one-shots focused on Mark and Jason, and a six-issue limited series called Battle of the Planets: Princess released in 2004, which was written by David Wohl and illustrated by Wilson Tortosa. Top Cow also published three issues of a manga version in 2003–2004.

Top Cow's license is now lapsed, and there are no plans for future Battle of the Planets works from them, including the unreleased Endgame.

A different Battle of the Planets strip was published in the UK weekly in TV Comic from 1981 to 1983, illustrated by Keith Watson.

Reception

The comic received mostly positive reviews from critics.

Collected editions
The various series have been collected into a number of trade paperbacks:

The Gold Key series:
Battle of the Planets Classics Volume 1 (140 pages, collects Battle of the Planets (1979) #1-10, Dynamic Forces, 2003)

The Top Cow comics:
Trial by Fire (collects Battle of the Planets #1-3, 80 pages, Titan Books, March 2003, Top Cow, May 2003)
Blood Red Sky (collects Battle of the Planets #4-9, 144 pages, Titan Books, November 2003, Top Cow, December 2003)
Destroy all Monsters (collects Battle of the Planets #10-12, Mark, Jason and Battle of the Planets/Witchblade, 208 pages, Top Cow, December 2003)

Digests of the Top Cow comics:
Trial By Fire ('collects Battle of the Planets #1-9 and Mark, 244 pages, Top Cow, January 2004)
Destroy All Monsters (collects Battle of The Planets #10-12, Battle of the Planets: Manga #1-3, Jason and Battle of the Planets/Witchblade, 248 pages, Top Cow, August 2004)

See also
List of comics based on television programs

References

Notes

1979 comics debuts
2002 comics debuts
Comics based on television series
Comics set on fictional planets
Science fiction comics
Gatchaman